Gaetano Fanti (1687 – 27 September 1759) was an Italian fresco painter born in Bologna.

Biography 

In 1715 Fanti was appointed by Prince Eugene of Savoy in Vienna. Together with figure painters such as Johann Michael Rottmayr, Paul Troger and Bartolomeo Altomonte he was involved in major frescoes. He is particularly noted for his work in Austria, including on the Karlskirche, the Melk Abbey, the Belvedere Palace and the Klosterneuburg Monastery. He died in Vienna.

References
 Joseph Zykan: Fanti, Gaetano. In: New German Biography (NDB). Volume 5, Duncker & Humblot, Berlin 1961, pp. 23 f (digitized).
 Kábdebo: Fanti. In: General German Biography (ADB). Volume 6, Duncker & Humblot, Leipzig 1877, p 567

External links 

18th-century Italian painters
Italian male painters
18th-century Austrian painters
18th-century Austrian male artists
Austrian male painters
1687 births
1759 deaths
18th-century Italian male artists